Tadhg Murphy (born 1951) was an Irish retired hurler who played as a goalkeeper for the Tipperary senior team.

Born in Roscrea, County Tipperary, Murphy first arrived on the inter-county scene at the age of seventeen when he first linked up with the Tipperary minor team before later joining the under-21 side. He joined the senior panel during the 1970 championship. Murphy went on to enjoy a brief career with Tipperary.

At club level Murphy was a one-time All-Ireland medallist with Roscrea. In addition to this he also won two Munster medals and four championship medals.

Throughout his career Murphy made 2 championship appearances. His retirement came following Tipperary's defeat by Limerick in the 1973 championship.

Honours

Player

Roscrea
All-Ireland Senior Club Hurling Championship (1): 1971
Munster Senior Club Hurling Championship (2): 1969, 1970
Tipperary Senior Hurling Championship (4): 1969, 1970, 1972, 1973

Tipperary
Munster Under-21 Hurling Championship (1): 1972

References

1951 births
Living people
Roscrea hurlers
Tipperary inter-county hurlers
Hurling goalkeepers